This is a timeline of European Union history and its previous development.


Distinct periods
Ideas before 1948
1948–1957
1958–1972
1973–1993
1993–2004
2004–present

Individual years
European Coal and Steel Community

European Economic Community

European Communities

European Union

Key events
1948 – Treaty of Brussels establishing the Western Union; 
1948 – Formation of the International Authority for the Ruhr
1949 – Treaty of London establishing the Council of Europe
1950 – Schuman Declaration proposes pooling French and German markets for coal and steel
1951 – Treaty of Paris creates the European Coal and Steel Community (ECSC)
1954 – Paris Agreements; Western Union transformed into Western European Union
1957 – Treaty of Rome creates European Economic Community (by "The Six": Belgium, France, Italy, Luxembourg, the Netherlands and West Germany)
1963 – Ankara Agreement initiated a three-step process toward creating a Customs Union which would help secure Turkey's full membership in the EEC.
1963 – Charles de Gaulle vetoes UK entry
1967 – ECSC, EEC and Euratom merged
1973 – Accession of Denmark, Ireland and the UK
1979 – First direct elections to Parliament
1981 – Accession of Greece
1985 – Delors Commission, Greenland leaves Community.
1986 – Single European Act; Accession of Portugal and Spain; flag adopted
1989 – The fall of the Iron Curtain in Eastern Europe
1992 – Maastricht Treaty formally called the Treaty on European Union - The European Union is born and Euro was introduced as the fellow currency (Denmark and the UK are not included in the EMU (European Monetary Union)).
1993 – Copenhagen criteria defined
1995 – Accession of Austria, Finland and Sweden
1997 – Treaty of Amsterdam
1999 – Fraud in the Commission results in resignation
1999 - The Euro as an 'accounting currency' officially replaces twelve national currencies
2002 – Euro banknotes and coins physically replace the twelve national currencies
2003 – Treaty of Nice
2004 – Accession of ten countries (Cyprus, Czech Republic, Estonia, Hungary, Latvia, Lithuania, Malta, Poland, Slovakia, Slovenia); signing of Constitution
2005 – France and the Netherlands reject the Constitution after own internal referendums (for France it was a binding one only)
2007 – Accession of Bulgaria and Romania
2009 – Lisbon Treaty abolishes the three pillars of the European Union
2013 – Accession of Croatia
2016 – UK holds a Membership Referendum and votes to leave the European Union
2017 – Negotiations between UK and the EU officially started in June 2017
2017 – Start of Brexit: On 29 March 2017, the Government of the United Kingdom invoked Article 50 of the Treaty on European Union. The UK was due to leave the EU on 29 March 2019 at 11 p.m. GMT, when the period for negotiating a withdrawal agreement was set to end
2020 – UK leaves the EU after the Brexit withdrawal agreement takes effect on 31 January 2020 at 11 p.m. GMT

Structural evolution

See also
History of the European Union
Ideas of European unity before 1945
History of European integration (1948–1957)
History of the European Communities (1958–1972)
History of the European Communities (1973–1993)
History of the European Union (1993–2004)
History of the European Union (since 2004)
European Coal and Steel Community
European Economic Community

External links
A timeline of the EU – BBC News.
The history of the European Union – Europa
European Union Politics Timeline - Oxford University Press: European Union Politics Resource Centre
Archival material concerning the history of the European Union can be consulted at the Historical Archives of the European Union in Florence

History of the European Union
Regional timelines